Chris Holmes may refer to:
 Chris Holmes, Baron Holmes of Richmond, British Paralympian swimmer and peer
 Chris Holmes (mathematician), British statistician
 Chris Holmes (musician) (born 1958), American musician and member of the band W.A.S.P.
 Chris Holmes, American musician and producer who toured with The Smashing Pumpkins 
 Chris Holmes, British keyboard player, member of Timebox and Babe Ruth
 Chris Holmes, producer of the Megan Slankard album Freaky Little Story
 Chris Holmes, pseudonym of radio DJ Chris Moyles whilst at Radio Luxembourg

See also
 Kris Holmes (born 1950), type designer